Magnitka Temirtau was an ice hockey team in Temirtau, Kazakhstan. They participated in the Kazakhstan Hockey Championship during the 1999–2000 season. Magnitka finished in seventh place in the first round.

References

Defunct ice hockey teams in Kazakhstan
Temirtau